Bouvier des Ardennes is a rare dog breed from Belgium. Originating in the Ardennes region these dogs were used to herd cattle. The loss of farms in the area led to serious decline in the numbers of these dogs until 1985 when some breeders found a few dogs and used the original breed standard as their guide in re-introducing the dog.

History
In the past, all the dogs that worked with cattle were called Bouvier (bovine herder). Each region throughout the area had its own type. From ancient rough-coated stock, these dogs were prized guardians and drovers. As the motorized age arrived, the need for driving cattle to the market was gone and so was the call that helped with the drives.

The Bouviers were almost eliminated after the bloody fighting of World War I. Many of the rarer types were lost altogether. The breeds that are a memory include: Bouvier des Roulers, Bouvier des Moerman, and Bouvier des Paret. Still remaining are the Bouvier des Ardennes and Bouvier des Flandres.

Appearance 
The Bouvier De Ardennes can come in any colour except white. It is usually found in brindled or peppered variety. It has medium length, coarse, wiry hair, with a "beard" and "eyebrows". This dog can be naturally short tails and long tails (both allowed, the ideal of natural short), high ears and a keen eye

Size 

See also
 Dogs portal
 List of dog breeds

References

FCI breeds
Herding dogs
Ardennes
Rare dog breeds